Amin Mohamed Omar  is an Egyptian football referee. He became a FIFA referee in 2017.

Omar made his first appearance as a referee in the Egyptian Premier League in 2013. In 2019, he was selected to officiate at the 2019 FIFA U-17 World Cup in Brazil.

References

1985 births
Egyptian football referees
Living people